Aprominta tectaphella is a moth of the family Autostichidae. It is found on Crete.

The wingspan is 12-12.5 mm. The ground colour of the forewings is white, sprinkled with brown. The hindwings are dark brownish grey.

References

Moths described in 1916
Aprominta
Moths of Europe